The Bowland Forest High milestone is an historic milestone marker in the English parish of Bowland Forest High, in the Trough of Bowland, Lancashire. A Grade II listed structure, erected in 1739, the milestone is in sandstone and has a rectangular plan and a shaped top. It is inscribed with the distances in miles, on one face to Lancaster and to Clitheroe (both in archaic spelling), and on the other face to Slaidburn and to Hornby.

Inscriptions
West face: "To Lankster 11:MS", which translates to "To Lancaster, 11 miles"
South face: "To Clitherc 7:MS" ("To Clitheroe, 7 miles")
East face: "To Slaidburn 3:MS"
North face: "To Hornby 10:MS"

See also
Listed buildings in Bowland Forest High

References

Notes

Grade II listed buildings in Lancashire
Milestones
1739 establishments in England
Buildings and structures in Ribble Valley
Forest of Bowland